Shanamkarak (also, Asha-nahm-ka, Eh-qua-nek, He-co-necks, Ikwanek, and Ke-ko-nek) is a former Karok settlement in Humboldt County, California.

References

Former settlements in Humboldt County, California
Former populated places in California
Karuk villages
Lost Native American populated places in the United States